Joanna Sue Zeiger (born May 4, 1970) is an American triathlete who is the 2008 Ironman 70.3 world champion. Zeiger represented the United States at the 2000 Summer Olympics in triathlon. She's the author of The Champions Mindset - An Athlete's Guide to Mental Toughness.

Early and personal life
Zeiger was born in Baltimore, Maryland, grew up in San Diego, California, lives in Boulder, Colorado, and is Jewish. She attended Patrick Henry High School in San Diego, graduating in 1988.

Career
Zeiger first began competing in swimming.

She and her sister, Laurie, represented the United States at the 1989 Maccabiah Games, the Jewish Olympics, in swimming. She won a gold medal, a silver medal, and two bronze medals.

She attended Brown University, where she held the school records in the  freestyle,  freestyle, and  freestyle which she set in 1991. Zeiger received her PhD from Johns Hopkins University's Bloomberg School of Public Health in 2001. Competitive running and cycling were added to her repertoire in 1992 and 1993.

Zeiger competed at the first Olympic triathlon at the 2000 Summer Olympics. She placed fourth with a total time of 2:01:25.74. Her split times were 19:45.58 for the swim, 1:05:38.30 for the cycling, and 0:36:01.86 for the run. In the same year, she finished fifth at the Ironman World Championship with a time of 9:48:34. She's the winner of Ironman Brasil 2005 and Ironman Coeur d'Alene 2006.

In 2008, Zeiger won the Ironman 70.3 World Championship in Clearwater, Florida with a time of 4:02.49.

Honors
Zeiger was named the 1997 Amateur Triathlete of the Year. In 1998, she was named 1998 USA Triathlon's Rookie of the year and in 2000 the USOC Triathlete of the year.
Zeiger was honored by the Jewish Sports Hall of fame in March 2001.

See also
List of Jewish triathletes

References

External links

Joanna Zeiger's blog

1970 births
Living people
American female triathletes
Triathletes at the 2000 Summer Olympics
Jewish American sportspeople
Track and field athletes from Baltimore
Johns Hopkins University alumni
Jewish swimmers
Competitors at the 1989 Maccabiah Games
Maccabiah Games gold medalists for the United States
Maccabiah Games silver medalists for the United States
Maccabiah Games bronze medalists for the United States
Maccabiah Games medalists in swimming
Sportspeople from Boulder, Colorado
Track and field athletes from San Diego
Olympic triathletes of the United States
21st-century American Jews
21st-century American women